The Dominican Republic Road Race Championships are held annually to decide the national cycling champions in the road race discipline, across various categories. This event about the Dominican Republic's Road Cycling Championships is hosted by the Federacion Dominicana de Ciclismo.

Men

Elite

U23

Women

Elite

References

See also
Dominican Republic National Time Trial Championships

National road cycling championships
Cycle racing in the Dominican Republic